The 2022 Faun-Ardèche Classic was the 22nd edition of the Classic Sud-Ardèche cycle race. It was held on 26 February 2022 as a category 1.Pro race on the UCI ProSeries. The race started and finished in Guilherand-Granges.

Teams
Twenty-two teams of up to seven riders started the race: eleven UCI WorldTeams, six UCI ProTeams, and five UCI Continental. 114 riders finished out of the 146 who entered the race.

UCI WorldTeams

 
 
 
 
 
 
 
 
 
 
 

UCI ProTeams

 
 
 
 
 
 

UCI Continental Teams

Result

References

2022 in French sport
2022 UCI ProSeries
Classic Sud-Ardèche
February 2022 sports events in France